Minification may refer to:

Magnification, by a factor of less than one, producing a smaller image
Minification (programming), a software coding technique
Minimisation (psychology), a form of cognitive distortion

See also 
Minimization (disambiguation)